The Indian Navy (IN) is the maritime branch of the Indian Armed Forces. The President of India is the Supreme Commander of the Indian Navy. The Chief of Naval Staff, a four-star admiral, commands the navy. As a blue-water navy, it operates significantly in the Persian Gulf Region, the Horn of Africa, the Strait of Malacca, and routinely conducts anti-piracy operations and partners with other navies in the region. It also conducts routine two to three month-long deployments in the South and East China seas as well as the western Mediterranean sea simultaneously.

The primary objective of the navy is to safeguard the nation's maritime borders, and in conjunction with other Armed Forces of the union, act to deter or defeat any threats or aggression against the territory, people or maritime interests of India, both in war and peace. Through joint exercises, goodwill visits and humanitarian missions, including disaster relief, the Indian Navy promotes bilateral relations between nations.

As of June 2019, Indian Navy has 67,252 active and 75,000 reserve personnel in service and has a fleet of 150 ships and submarines, and 300 aircraft. As of September 2022, the operational fleet consists of 2 active aircraft carriers and 1 amphibious transport dock, 8 landing ship tanks, 11 destroyers, 13 frigates, 1 ballistic missile submarine, 16 conventionally-powered attack submarines, 24 corvettes, one mine countermeasure vessel, 4 fleet tankers and numerous other auxiliary vessels, small patrol boats and sophisticated ships. It is considered as a multi-regional power projection blue-water navy.

History

Early maritime history

 

The maritime history of India dates back 6,000 years to the Indus Valley civilisation. A Kutch mariner's log book from 19th century recorded that the first tidal dock India was built at Lothal around 2300 BC during the Indus Valley Civilisation, near the present day harbour of Mangrol on the Gujarat coast. The Rig Veda, credits Varuna, the Hindu god of water and the celestial ocean, with knowledge of the ocean routes and describes the use of ships having hundred oars in the naval expeditions by Indians. There are also references to the side wings of a ship called Plava, which stabilise the vessel during storms. Plava are considered to be the precursors of modern-day stabilisers. The first use of a mariner's compass, called as Matsya Yantra, was recorded in 4 or 5 AD.

Alexander the Great, during his conquest over India, built a harbour at Patala. His army retreated to Mesopotamia on the ships built at Sindh. In the later of his conquest, records show that the Emperor of Maurya Empire, Chandragupta Maurya, as a part of war office, established an Admiralty Division. Many historians from ancient India recorded the Indian trade relations. Indian trade reached Java and Sumatra. There were also references to the trade routes of countries in the Pacific and Indian Ocean. India also had trade relations with the Greeks and the Romans. At one instance Roman historian Gaius Plinius Secundus mentioned of Indian traders carrying away large masses of gold and silver from Rome, in payment for skins, precious stones, clothes, indigo, sandalwood, herbs, perfumes, and spices.

During 5–10 AD, the Kalinga Empire conquered Western Java, Sumatra and Malaya. The Andaman and Nicobar Islands served as an important halt point for trade ships en route to these nations and as well as China. During 844–848 AD the daily revenue from these nations was expected to be around 200 maunds of gold. During 984–1042 AD, under the reign of Raja Raja Chola I, Rajendra Chola I and Kulothunga Chola I, the naval expedition by Chola dynasty captured lands of Burma, Sumatra, Sri Lanka, and Malaya, and simultaneously repressing pirate activities by Sumatran warlords.

During 14th and 15th centuries, Indian shipbuilding skills and their maritime ability was sophisticated enough to produce ships with a capacity to carry over hundred men. Ships also had compartments included in their design, so that even if one compartment was damaged, the ship would remain afloat. These features of ships were developed by Indians even before Europeans were aware of the idea.

However, by the end of thirteenth century Indian naval power had started to decline, and had reached its low by the time the Portuguese entered India. Soon after they set foot in India, the Portuguese started to hunt down all Asian vessels not permitting their trade. Amidst this, in 1529, a naval war at Bombay Harbour resulted in the surrender of Thane, Karanja, and Bandora. By 1534, the Portuguese took complete control over the Bombay Harbour. The Zamorin of Calicut challenged the Portuguese trade when Vasco da Gama refused to pay the customs levy as per the trade agreement. This resulted in two major naval wars, the first one—Battle of Cochin, was fought in 1504, and the second engagement happened four years later off Diu. Both these wars, exposed the weakness of Indian maritime power and simultaneously helped the Portuguese to gain mastery over the Indian waters.

In the later seventeenth century Indian naval power observed remarkable revival. The alliance of the Moghuls and the Sidis of Janjira was marked as a major power on the west coast. On the southern front, the 1st Sovereign of the Maratha Empire, Chhatrapati Shivaji Maharaj, started creating his own fleet. His fleet was commanded by notable admirals like Sidhoji Gujar and Kanhoji Angre. The Maratha Navy under the leadership of Angre kept the English, Dutch and Portuguese away from the Konkan coast. However, the Marathas witnessed remarkable decline in their naval capabilities following the death of Angre in 1729.

1612 origins to independence

The origins of the Indian Navy date to 1612, when an English vessel under the command of Captain Best encountered the Portuguese. Although the Portuguese were defeated, this incident along with the trouble caused by the pirates to the merchant vessels, forced the British to maintain fleet near Surat, Gujarat. East India Company (HEIC) formed a naval arm, and the first squadron of fighting ships reached the Gujarat coast on 5 September 1612. Their objective was to protect British merchant shipping off the Gulf of Cambay and up the Narmada and Tapti rivers. As the HEIC continued to expand its rule and influence over different parts of India, the responsibility of Company's Marine increased too.

Over time, the British predominantly operated from Bombay, and in 1686, the HEIC's naval arm was renamed the Bombay Marine. At times the Bombay Marine engaged Dutch, French, Maratha, and Sidi vessels. Much later, it was also involved in the First Anglo-Burmese War of 1824. In 1834, the Bombay Marine became Her Majesty's Indian Navy. The Navy saw action in the First Opium War of 1840 and in the Second Anglo-Burmese War in 1852. Due to some unrecorded reasons, the Navy's name reverted to the Bombay Marine from 1863 to 1877, after which it was named Her Majesty's Indian Marine. At that time, the Marine operated in two divisions—the Eastern Division at Calcutta under the Superintendent of Bay of Bengal, and the Western Division at Bombay Superintendent of Arabian Sea.
In 1892 the Marine was renamed the Royal Indian Marine, and by the end of the 19th century it operated over fifty ships. The Marine participated in World War I with a fleet of patrol vessels, troop carriers, and minesweepers. In 1928, D. N. Mukherji was the first Indian to be granted a commission, in the rank of an Engineer Sub-lieutenant. Also in 1928, the RIM was accorded combatant status, which entitled it to be considered a true fighting force and to fly the White Ensign of the Royal Navy. In 1934, the Marine was upgraded to a full naval force, thus becoming the Royal Indian Navy (RIN), and was presented the King's colours in recognition of its services to the British Crown.

During the early stages of World War II, the tiny Royal Indian Navy consisted of five sloops, one survey vessel, one depot ship, one patrol vessel and numerous assorted small craft; personnel strength was at only 114 officers and 1,732 sailors. The onset of war led to an expansion in numbers of vessels and personnel. By June 1940, the navy had doubled its number in terms of both personnel and material, and expanded nearly six times of its pre-war strength by 1942. The navy was actively involved in operations during the war around the world and was heavily involved in operations around the Indian Ocean, including convoy escorts, mine-sweeping and supply, as well as supporting amphibious assaults.

When hostilities ceased in August 1945, the Royal Indian Navy had expanded to a personnel strength of over 25,000 officers and sailors. Its fleet comprised seven sloops, four frigates, four corvettes, fourteen minesweepers, sixteen trawlers, two depot ships, thirty auxiliary vessels, one hundred and fifty landing craft, two hundred harbour craft and several offensive and defensive motor launches. During World War II the Navy suffered two hundred and seventy five casualties—twenty seven officers, two warrant officers and 123 ratings killed in action, two ratings missing in action and a further 14 officers, two warrant officers and 123 ratings wounded. For their role in the war, the officers and ratings of the Navy received the following honours and decorations—a KBE (Mil.), a knighthood, a CB (Mil.), 10 CIEs, two DSOs, a CBE, 15 DSCs, an OBE, 28 DSMs, eight OBIs, two IOMs, 16 BEMs, 10 Indian Defence Service Medals, a Royal Humane Society Medal, 105 mentions in dispatches and 118 assorted commendations. Immediately after the war, the navy underwent a rapid, large-scale demobilisation of vessels and personnel.

From the inception of India's naval force, some senior Indian politicians had voiced concerns about the degree of "Indianisation" of the Navy and its subordination to the Royal Navy in all important aspects. On the eve of WWII, the RIN had no Indian senior line officers and only a single Indian senior engineer officer. Even by the war's end, the Navy remained a predominantly British-officered service; in 1945, no Indian officer held a rank above engineer commander and only a few Indian officers in the executive branch held substantive senior line officer rank. This situation, coupled with inadequate levels of training and discipline, poor communication between officers and ratings, instances of racial discrimination and the ongoing trials of ex-Indian National Army personnel ignited the Royal Indian Navy mutiny by Indian ratings in 1946. A total of 78 ships, 20 shore establishments and 20,000 sailors were involved in the strike, which spread over much of India. After the strike began, the sailors received encouragement and support from the Communist Party in India; unrest spread from the naval ships, and led to student and worker hartals in Bombay. The strike ultimately failed as the sailors did not receive substantial support from either the Indian Army or from political leaders in Congress or the Muslim League. On 21 July 1947, H.M.S. Choudhry and Bhaskar Sadashiv Soman, both of whom would eventually command the Pakistani and Indian Navies, respectively, became the first Indian RIN officers to attain the acting rank of captain.

Independence to the end of the 20th century

Following independence and the partition of India on 15 August 1947, the RIN's depleted fleet of ships and remaining personnel were divided between the newly independent Dominion of India and Dominion of Pakistan. 21 percent of the Navy's officer cadre and 47 percent of its sailors opted to join the portion of the fleet which became the Royal Pakistan Navy. The Indian share of the Navy consisted of 32 vessels along with 11,000 personnel. Effective from the same date, all British officers were compulsorily retired from the Navy and its reserve components, with Indian officers being promoted to replace British senior officers. However, a number of British flag and senior officers were invited to continue serving in the RIN, as only nine of the Navy's Indian commissioned officers had more than 10 years' service, with the majority of them only having served from five to eight years. Rear Admiral John Talbot Savignac Hall headed the Navy as its first Commander-in-Chief (C-in-C) post-Independence. In January 1948, D.N. Mukherji, the first Indian officer in the RIN, became the first Indian to be promoted acting engineer captain. In May 1948, Captain Ajitendu Chakraverti became the first Indian officer to be appointed to the rank of commodore.  When India became a republic on 26 January 1950, the Royal prefix was dropped and the name Indian Navy was officially adopted. The prefix for naval vessels was changed from His Majesty's Indian Ship (HMIS) to Indian Naval Ship (INS). At the same time, the imperial crown in insignia was replaced with the Lion Capital of Ashoka and the Union Jack in the canton of the White Ensign was replaced with the Indian Tricolour.

By 1955, the Navy had largely overcome its post-Independence personnel shortfalls. During the early years following independence, many British officers continued to serve in the Navy on secondment from the Royal Navy, due to the post-Independence retirement or transfer of many experienced officers to the Royal or the Pakistan navies. The first C-in-C of the Navy was Admiral Sir Edward Parry who took over from Hall in 1948 and handed over to Admiral Sir Charles Thomas Mark Pizey in 1951. Admiral Pizey also became the first Chief of the Naval Staff in 1955, and was succeeded by Vice Admiral Sir Stephen Hope Carlill the same year The pace of "Indianising" continued steadily through the 1950s. By 1952, senior Naval appointments had begun to be filled by Indian officers, and by 1955, basic training for naval cadets was entirely conducted in India. In 1956, Ram Dass Katari became the first Indian flag officer, and was appointed the first Indian Commander of the Fleet on 2 October. On 22 April 1958, Vice Admiral Katari assumed the command of the Indian Navy from Carlill as the first Indian Chief of Staff of the Indian Navy. With the departure in 1962 of the last British officer on secondment to the Navy, Commodore David Kirke, the Chief of Naval Aviation, the Indian Navy finally became an entirely Indian service.

The first engagement in action of the Indian Navy was against the Portuguese Navy during the liberation of Goa in 1961. Operation Vijay followed years of escalating tension due to Portuguese refusal to relinquish its colonies in India. On 21 November 1961, Portuguese troops fired on the passenger liner Sabarmati near Anjadip Island, killing one person and injuring another. During Operation Vijay, the Indian Navy supported troop landings and provided fire support. The cruiser  sank one Portuguese patrol boat, while frigates  and  destroyed the Portuguese frigate . The 1962 Sino-Indian War was largely fought over the Himalayas and the Navy had only a defensive role in the war.

At the outbreak of Indo-Pakistani War of 1965, the Navy had one aircraft carrier, two cruisers, nineteen destroyers and frigates, and one tanker. Of these twenty-ships ten were under refit. The others were largely involved coastal patrols. During the war, the Pakistani Navy attacked the Indian coastal city of Dwarka, although there were no military resources in the area. While this attack was insignificant, India deployed naval resources to patrol the coast and deter further bombardment. Following these wars in the 1960s, India resolved to strengthen the profile and capabilities of its Armed Forces.

The dramatic change in the Indian Navy's capabilities and stance was emphatically demonstrated during the Indo-Pakistani War of 1971. Under the command of Admiral Sardarilal Mathradas Nanda, the navy successfully enforced a naval blockade of West and East Pakistan. On 4 December, the Indian Navy successfully executed Operation Trident, a devastating attack on the Pakistan Naval Headquarters of Karachi that sank a minesweeper, a destroyer and an ammunition supply ship. The attack also irreparably damaged another destroyer and oil storage tanks at the Karachi port. To commemorate this, 4 December is celebrated as the Navy Day. This was followed by Operation Python on 8 December 1971, further deprecating the Pakistan Navy's capabilities. In the Bay of Bengal, the aircraft carrier  was deployed to successfully enforce the naval blockade on East Pakistan. Sea Hawk and the Alizé aircraft from INS Vikrant sank numerous gunboats and Pakistani merchant marine ships. To demonstrate its solidarity as an ally of Pakistan, the United States sent Task Force 74 centred around the aircraft carrier  into the Bay of Bengal. In retaliation, Soviet Navy submarines trailed the American task force, which moved away from the Indian Ocean towards Southeast Asia to avert a confrontation. In the end, the Indian naval blockade of Pakistan choked off the supply of reinforcements to the Pakistani forces, which proved to be decisive in the overwhelming defeat of Pakistan.

Since playing a decisive role in the victory, the navy has been a deterrent force maintaining peace for India in a region of turmoil. In 1983, the Indian Navy planned for Operation Lal Dora to support the government of Mauritius against a feared coup. In 1986, in Operation Flowers are Blooming, the Indian Navy averted an attempted coup in the Seychelles. In 1988, India launched Operation Cactus, to successfully thwart a coup d'état by PLOTE in the Maldives. Naval maritime reconnaissance aircraft detected the ship hijacked by PLOTE rebels.  and Indian marine commandos recaptured the ship and arrested the rebels. During the 1999 Kargil War, the Western and Eastern fleets were deployed in the Northern Arabian Sea, as a part of Operation Talwar. They safeguarded India's maritime assets from a potential Pakistani naval attack, as also deterred Pakistan from attempting to block India's sea-trade routes. The Indian Navy's aviators flew sorties and marine commandos fought alongside Indian Army personnel in the Himalayas.

In October 1999, the Navy along with the Indian Coast Guard rescued MV Alondra Rainbow, a pirated Japanese cargo ship.

21st century onwards

In the 21st century, the Indian Navy has played an important role in maintaining peace for India on the maritime front, in spite of the state of foment in its neighbourhood. It has been deployed for humanitarian relief in times of natural disasters and crises across the globe, as well as to keep India's maritime trade routes free and open.

The Indian Navy was a part of the joint forces exercises, Operation Parakram, during the 2001–2002 India–Pakistan standoff. More than a dozen warships were deployed to the northern Arabian Sea.
In October, the Indian Navy took over operations to secure the Strait of Malacca, to relieve US Navy resources for Operation Enduring Freedom.

The navy plays an important role in providing humanitarian relief in times of natural disasters, including floods, cyclones and tsunamis. In the aftermath of the 2004 Indian Ocean earthquake and tsunami, the Indian Navy launched massive disaster relief operations to help affected Indian states as well as Maldives, Sri Lanka and Indonesia. Over 27 ships, dozens of helicopters, at least six fixed-wing aircraft and over 5000 personnel of the navy were deployed in relief operations. These included Operation Madad in Andhra Pradesh and Tamil Nadu, Operation Sea Waves in the Andaman and Nicobar Islands, Operation Castor in Maldives, Operation Rainbow in Sri Lanka and Operation Gambhir in Indonesia. Gambhir, carried out following the 2004 Indian Ocean tsunami, was one of the largest and fastest force mobilisations that the Indian Navy has undertaken. Indian naval rescue vessels and teams reached neighbouring countries less than 12 hours from the time that the tsunami hit.

During the 2006 Israel-Lebanon conflict, the Indian Navy launched Operation Sukoon and evacuated 2,280 persons from 20 to 29 July 2006 including 436 Sri Lankans, 69 Nepalese and 7 Lebanese nationals from war-torn Lebanon. In 2006, Indian naval doctors served for 102 days on board  to conduct medical camps in the Philippines, Bangladesh, Indonesia and East Timor. In 2007, Indian Navy supported relief operations for the survivors of Cyclone Sidr in Bangladesh. In 2008, Indian Naval vessels were the first to launch international relief operations for victims of Cyclone Nargis in Myanmar. In 2008, the navy deployed  and  into the Gulf of Aden to combat piracy in Somalia. Tabar prevented numerous piracy attempts, and escorted hundreds of ships safely through the pirate-infested waters. The navy also undertook anti-piracy patrols near the Seychelles, upon that country's request.

In February 2011, the Indian Navy launched Operation Safe Homecoming and rescued Indian nationals from war torn Libya. Between January–March, the navy launched Operation Island Watch to deter piracy attempts by Somali pirates off the Lakshadweep archipelago. This operation has had numerous successes in preventing pirate attacks. During the 2015 crisis in Yemen, the Indian Navy was part of Operation Raahat and rescued 3074 individuals of which 1291 were foreign nationals.

Current role

Currently, the principal roles of the Indian Navy are:
 In conjunction with other Armed Forces of the union, act to deter or defeat any threats or aggression against the territory, people or maritime interests of India, both in war and peace;
 Project influence in India's maritime area of interest, to further the nation's political, economic and security objectives;
 In co-operation with the Indian Coast Guard, ensure good order and stability in India's maritime zones of responsibility.
 Provide maritime assistance (including disaster relief) in India's maritime neighbourhood.

Command and organisation

Organisation

While the President of India serves as the Supreme Commander of the Indian Armed Forces, the organisational structure of Indian Navy is headed by the Chief of Naval Staff (CNS), who holds the rank of Admiral. While the provision for the rank of Admiral of the Fleet exists, no officer of the Indian Navy has yet been conferred this rank. The CNS is assisted by the Vice Chief of Naval Staff (VCNS), a Vice Admiral; the CNS also heads the Integrated Headquarters (IHQ) of the Ministry of Defence (Navy), based in New Delhi. The Deputy Chief of Naval Staff (DCNS), a vice-admiral, is a Principal Staff Officer (PSO), along with the Chief of Personnel (COP) and the Chief of Materiel (COM), both of whom are also vice-admirals. The Director General Medical Services (Navy) is a Surgeon Vice-Admiral, heads the medical services of the Indian Navy.

The Indian Navy operates two operational commands and one training command. Each command is headed by a Flag Officer Commanding-in-Chief (FOC-in-C) of the rank of Vice Admiral. The Eastern and Western commands each have a Fleet commanded by a Rear Admiral. The Western Fleet based at Mumbai is commanded by the Flag Officer Commanding Western Fleet (FOCWF) and the Eastern Fleet, based at Visakhapatnam, is commanded by the Flag Officer Commanding Eastern Fleet (FOCEF). They each also have a Commodore commanding submarines (COMCOS) - the Commodore Commanding Submarines (East) and the Commodore Commanding Submarines (West). The Flag Officer Submarines, the single-point class authority for submarines is based at the Eastern Naval Command. The Southern Naval Command is home to the Flag Officer Sea Training (FOST).

Additionally, the Andaman and Nicobar Command is a unified Indian Navy, Indian Army, Indian Air Force, and Indian Coast Guard theater command based at the capital, Port Blair. Commander-in-Chief, Andaman and Nicobar Command (CINCAN) receives staff support from, and reports directly to the Chairman Chiefs of Staff Committee (COSC) in New Delhi. The Command was set up in the Andaman and Nicobar Islands in 2001.

Facilities

Indian Navy has its operational and training bases in Gujarat, Karnataka, Goa, Maharashtra, Lakshadweep, Kerala, Odisha, Tamil Nadu, Andhra Pradesh, West Bengal, and Andaman and Nicobar Islands. These bases are intended for various purposes such as logistics and maintenance support, ammunition support, air stations, hospitals, MARCOS bases, coastal defence, missile defence, submarine and missile boat bases, forward operating bases etc. Of these, INS Shivaji is one of the oldest naval bases in India. Commissioned in February 1945 as HMIS Shivaji, it now serves as the premier Technical Training Establishment (TTE) of the Indian Navy.

In May 2005, the Indian Navy commissioned  at Karwar,  from Goa. Built under the first phase of the Project Seabird, at first it was an exclusively Navy controlled base without sharing port facilities with commercial shipping. The Indian Navy also has berthing rights in Oman and Vietnam. The Navy operates a monitoring station, fitted with radars and surveillance gear to intercept maritime communication, in Madagascar. It also plans to build a further 32 radar stations in Seychelles, Mauritius, Maldives and Sri Lanka. According to Intelligence Online, published by a France-based global intelligence gathering organisation, Indigo Publications, the Navy is believed to be operating a listening post in Ras al-Hadd, Oman.

Project Varsha is a highly classified project undertaken by the Navy to construct a hi-tech base under the Eastern Naval Command. The base is said to house nuclear submarines and also a VLF facility.

Training

Indian Navy has a specialized training command which is responsible for organisation, conduct and overseeing of all basic, professional and specialist training throughout the Navy. The Commander in Chief of Southern Command also serves as the Commander in Chief of Training Command. The Chief of Personnel (CoP) at HQ of Indian Navy is responsible for the framework of training, and exercises the responsibility through Directorate of Naval Training (DNT). The training year of Indian Navy is defined from 1 July to 30 June of the following year.

Seaman training is held at Ins Chilika,Orissa . 

Officer training is conducted at Indian Naval Academy (INA) at Ezhimala, on the coast of Kerala. Established in 2009, it is the largest naval academy in Asia. Cadets from National Defence Academy also move to INA for their later terms. The Navy also has specialized training establishments for gunnery, aviation, leadership, logistics, music, medicine, physical training, educational training, engineering, hydrography, submarines etc. at several naval bases along the coastline of India. Naval officers also attend the tri-service institutions National Defence College, College of Defence Management and Defence Services Staff College for various staff courses to higher command and staff appointments. The Navy's War college is the Naval War College, Goa. A dedicated wing for naval architecture under Directorate of Naval Architecture at IIT Delhi is operated by the Navy. Indian Navy also trains officers and men from the navies of friendly foreign countries.

Rank structure

, the Navy has 10,393 officers and 56,835 sailors against a sanctioned strength of 11,827 officers and 71,656 sailors. This is inclusive of naval aviation, marine commandos and Sagar Prahari Bal personnel.

Officers
India uses the Midshipman rank in its navy, and all future officers carry the rank upon entering the Indian Naval Academy. They are commissioned Sub-lieutenants upon finishing their course of study.

While the provision for the rank of Admiral of the Fleet exists, it is primarily intended for major wartime use and honour. No officer of the Indian Navy has yet been conferred this rank. Both the Army and Air Force have had officers who have been conferred with the equivalent rank – Field Marshals Sam Manekshaw and Cariappa of the Army and Marshal of the Indian Air Force (MIAF) Arjan Singh.

The highest ranked naval officer in organisation structure is the Chief of Naval Staff, who holds the rank of admiral.

Rating personnel

In the Indian Navy, the sailors are initially listed as, Seaman 2nd class. As they grow through the ranks they attain the highest rank of enlisted personnel, Master chief petty officer 1st class. Sailors who possess leadership qualities and fulfill requisite conditions in terms of education, age etc. may be commissioned through Commission worthy and Special Duties (CW & SD) scheme.

Navy MCPO 
Indian Navy has appointed Rajendra Kumar Behera MCPO I as the first Navy MCPO on 1 May 2022.

Naval Air Arm

The naval air-arm of the Indian Navy currently operates twenty-one air squadrons. Of these, ten operate fixed-wing aircraft, eight are helicopter squadrons and the remaining three are equipped with unmanned aerial vehicles (UAV). Building on the legacy inherited from the Royal Navy prior to Indian independence, the concept of naval aviation in India started with the establishment of Directorate of Naval Aviation at Naval Headquarters (NHQ) in early 1948. Later that year officers and sailors from the Indian Navy were sent to Britain for pilot training. In 1951, the Fleet Requirement Unit (FRU) was formed to meet the aviation requirements of the navy.

On 1 January 1953, the charge of Cochin airfield was handed over to the navy from the Directorate General of Civil Aviation. On 11 March, the FRU was commissioned at Cochin with ten newly acquired Sealand aircraft. The navy's first air station, INS Garuda, was commissioned two months later. From February 1955 to December 1958, ten Firefly aircraft were acquired. To meet the training requirements of the pilots, the indigenously developed HAL HT-2 trainer was inducted into the FRU. On 17 January 1959, the FRU was commissioned as Indian Naval Air Squadron (INAS) 550, to be the first Indian naval air squadron.

Currently the air arm operates an aircraft carrier INS Vikramaditya with ability to carry over thirty aircraft including MiG 29K, Kamov 31, Kamov 28, Sea King and domestic-built HAL-Dhruv and Chetak helicopters. The Kamov-31 choppers also provide the airborne early warning cover for the fleet. In the anti-submarine role, the Sea King, Ka-28, and the domestic built HAL Dhruv are used. The MARCOS also use Sea King and HAL Dhruv helicopters while conducting operations. Maritime patrol and reconnaissance operations are carried out by the Boeing P-8 Poseidon and the Ilyushin 38. Indian Navy is also procuring 24 Lockheed Martin MH-60R Multi Role Helicopters under the foreign military sales from the US.

The UAV arm consists of the IAI Heron and Searcher-IIs that are operated from both surface ships and shore establishments for surveillance missions.

The Indian Navy also maintains an aerobatic display team, the Sagar Pawan. The Sagar Pawan team will be replacing their present Kiran HJT-16 aircraft with the newly developed HJT-36 aircraft.

MARCOS

The Marine Commando Force (MCF), also known as MARCOS, is a special operations unit that was raised by the Indian Navy in 1987 for Amphibious warfare, Close Quarter Combat Counter-terrorism, Direct action, Special reconnaissance, Unconventional warfare, Hostage rescue, Personnel recovery, Combat search and rescue, Asymmetric warfare, Foreign internal defence, Counterproliferation, Amphibious reconnaissance including Hydrographic reconnaissance. Since their inception MARCOS proved themselves in various operations and wars, notable of them include Operation Pawan, Operation Cactus, UNOSOM II, Kargil War and Operation Black Tornado. They are also actively deployed on anti-piracy operations throughout the year.

Equipment

Ships

The names of all in service ships and naval bases of the Indian Navy are prefixed with the letters INS, designating Indian Naval Ship or Indian Navy Station, whereas the sail boats are prefixed with INSV (Indian Naval Sailing Vessel). The fleet of the Indian Navy is a mixture of domestic built and foreign vessels, the surface fleet comprises 2 aircraft carrier, 1 amphibious transport dock, 8 landing ship tanks, 11 destroyers, 13 frigates, 23 corvettes, 10 large offshore patrol vessels, 4 fleet tankers, 7 Survey ships, 1 research vessel, 3 training vessels and various auxiliary vessels, Landing Craft Utility vessels, and small patrol boats.

The Navy has two aircraft carriers in active service, INS Vikramaditya, which serves as the flagship of the fleet. Vikramaditya (formerly Admiral Gorshkov) is a modified  procured at a total cost $2.3 billion from Russia in December 2013. A second aircraft carrier, the indigenously built INS Vikrant was commissioned on September 2, 2022. It also maintains a fleet of landing ship tanks.

The navy currently operates three , three  and three -class guided-missile destroyers. The ships of the Rajput class is getting replaced with future the next-generation s (Project 15B) which feature number of improvements.

In addition to destroyers, the navy operates several classes of frigates such as three  (Project 17 class) and six -class frigates. Seven additional Shivalik-class frigates (Project 17A class frigates) are on order, first 3 of which have already been delivered with the latest induction being INS Udaygiri. Smaller littoral zone combatants in service are in the form of corvettes, of which the Indian Navy operates the Kamorta,  and  corvettes. Replenishment tankers such as the Jyoti-class tanker,  and the new - help improve the navy's endurance at sea.

Aircraft

Submarines

, the Navy's sub-surface fleet includes one nuclear-powered attack submarine, one ballistic missile submarine, 16 conventionally-powered attack submarines. The conventional attack submarines of the Indian Navy consist of the five  (French  design), the seven  (Russian  design), and the four  (German Type 209/1500 design) classes.

India also possesses a single -class nuclear-powered attack submarine named . She is under lease to India for a period of ten years. Three hundred Indian Navy personnel were trained in Russia for the operation of these submarines. Negotiations are on with Russia for the lease of the second Akula-class submarine.

 was launched on 26 July 2009 in Visakhapatnam, and was secretly commissioned into active service in August 2016. The Navy plans to have six nuclear-powered ballistic missile submarines in service in the near future. Arihant is both the first boat of the  nuclear-powered ballistic missile submarines and the first nuclear-powered submarine to be built in India.

Weapon systems

The Navy use a mix of indigenously developed and foreign made missile systems. These include submarine-launched ballistic missiles, ship-launched ballistic missiles, cruise and anti-ship missiles, air-to-air missiles, surface-to-air missiles, torpedoes, air-to-air guns, main guns and anti-submarine rocket launchers.

In the recent years BrahMos has been one of the most advanced missile system adapted by the Indian Navy. It has been jointly developed by India's Defence Research and Development Organisation (DRDO) and Russian NPO Mashinostroyeniya. BrahMos is the world's fastest anti-ship cruise missile in operation. The BrahMos has been tailored to meet Indian needs and features a large proportion of India-designed components and technology, including its fire control systems, transporter erector launchers, and its onboard navigational attack systems. The successful test of Brahmos from  provides Indian Navy with precision land attack capability.

India has also fitted its Boeing P-8I reconnaissance aircraft with all-weather, active-radar-homing, over-the-horizon AGM-84L Harpoon Block II missiles and Mk 54 All-Up-Round Lightweight Torpedoes. Indian warships' primary air-defence shield is provided by Barak 1 surface-to-air missile while an advanced version Barak 8 is in development in collaboration with Israel. India's next-generation  submarines will be armed with Exocet anti-ship missile system.

The K-15 Sagarika (Oceanic) submarine-launched ballistic missile (SLBM), which has a range of at least 700 km (some sources claim 1000 km) forms part of India's nuclear triad and is extensively tested to be integrated with the Arihant class of nuclear submarines. A longer range submarine launched ballistic missile called K-4 is under induction process, to be followed by K-5 SLBM.

Electronic warfare and systems management

Sangraha is a joint electronic warfare programme between Defence Research and Development Organisation (DRDO) and the Indian Navy. The programme is intended to develop a family of electronic warfare suites, for use on different naval platforms capable of detecting, intercepting, and classifying pulsed, carrier wave, pulse repetition frequency agile, frequency agile and chirp radars. The systems are suitable for deployment on various platforms like helicopters, vehicles, and ships. Certain platforms, along with ESM (Electronic Support Measures) capabilities, have ECM (Electronic Countermeasure) capabilities such as multiple-beam phased array jammers.

The Indian Navy also relies on information technology to face the challenges of the 21st century. The Indian Navy is implementing a new strategy to move from a platform centric force to a network centric force by linking all shore-based installations and ships via a high-speed data networks and satellites. This will help in increased operational awareness. The network is referred to as the Navy Enterprise Wide Network (NEWN). The Indian Navy has also provided training to all its personnel in Information Technology (IT) at the Naval Institute of Computer Applications (NICA) located in Mumbai. Information technology is also used to provide better training, like the usage of simulators and for better management of the force.

The Navy has a dedicated cadre for matters pertaining to information technology cadre named as Information Technology Cadre, under the Directorate of Information Technology (DRI). The cadre is responsible for implementation for enterprise wide networking and software development projects, development activities with respect to cyber security products, administration of shore and on-board networks, and management of critical Naval Networks and software applications.

Naval satellite
India's first exclusive defence satellite GSAT-7 was successfully launched by European space consortium Arianespace's rocket from Kourou spaceport in French Guiana in August 2013. GSAT-7 was fabricated by the Indian Space Research Organisation (ISRO) to serve for at least seven years in its orbital slot at 74°E, providing UHF, S-band, C-band and Ku-band relay capacity. Its Ku-band allows high-density data transmission, including both audio and video. This satellite also has a provision to reach smaller and mobile terminals.

This enables the Navy to operate in a network-centric atmosphere having real-time networking of all its operational assets at sea and on land.

On 15 June 2019 the navy placed an order for GSAT-7R satellite as a replacement for GSAT-7. The satellite costs Rs 1589 crores (US$225.5 million) and is expected to be launched by 2020.

Activities

Fleet reviews

The President of India is entitled to inspect his/her fleet, as he/she is the supreme commander of the Indian Armed Forces. The first president's fleet review by India was hosted by Dr. Rajendra Prasad on 10 October 1953. President's reviews usually take place once in the President's term. In all, ten fleet reviews have taken place, including in February 2006, when former president Dr. APJ Abdul Kalam took the review. The latest, in February 2022, by President Ram Nath Kovind.

The Indian Navy also conducted an International fleet review named Bridges of Friendship in February 2001 in Mumbai. Many ships of friendly Navies from all around the world participated, including two from the US Navy. The second international fleet review, the International Fleet Review 2016, was held off Visakhapatnam coast in February 2016 where Indian Navy's focus was on improving diplomatic relations and military compatibility with other nations.

Naval exercises

India often conducts naval exercises with other friendly countries designed to increase naval cooperation and also to strengthen cooperative security relationship. Some such exercises take place annually or biennially:

Coordinated patrols include: Indo–Thai CORPAT (28 editions), Indonesia–India CORPAT (33 editions),  IMCOR with Myanmar (8 editions). The Indian Navy conducted a naval exercise with the People's Liberation Army Navy in 2003, and also sent ships to the South China Sea to participate in the fleet review. In 2005, TROPEX (Theatre-level Readiness Operational Exercises) was held during which Indian Navy experimented the doctrine of influencing a land and air battle to support the Indian Army and the Indian Air Force. TROPEX has been conducted annually every year with an exception to 2016. In 2007, Indian Navy conducted naval exercises with Japan Maritime Self-Defence Force and U.S Navy in the Pacific, and also signed an agreement with Japan in October 2008 for joint naval patrolling in the Asia-Pacific region. In 2007, India conducted naval exercises with Vietnam, Philippines, and New Zealand. In 2007, India and South Korea conducted an annual naval exercise, alongside India's participation in the South Korean International Fleet Review in 2008. The first Atlantic Ocean deployment of the Indian Navy happened in 2009. During this deployment, the Indian Naval fleet conducted exercises with the French, German, Russian and British navies.  Once in two years navies from the Indian Ocean region meet at the Andaman and Nicobar Islands for the Exercise MILAN. In 2021 India assisted in US-led Exercise Cutlass Express as a trainer.

In 2007 India held the first Indian Ocean Naval Symposium (IONS) with an objective to provide a forum for all the littoral nations of the Indian Ocean to co-operate on mutually agreed areas for better security in the region. Since the past decade, Indian naval ships have made goodwill port calls to Israel, Turkey, Egypt, Greece, Thailand, Indonesia, Australia, New Zealand, Tonga, South Africa, Kenya, Qatar, Oman, United Arab Emirates, Bahrain, Kuwait, and various other countries.

Exploration

The Indian Navy regularly conducts adventure expeditions. The sailing ship and training vessel  began circumnavigating the world on 23 January 2003, intending to foster good relations with various other nations; she returned to India in May 2004 after visiting 36 ports in 18 nations.

Lt. Cdr. M. S. Kohli led the Indian Navy's first successful expedition to Mount Everest in 1965; the Navy's ensign was again flown atop Everest on 19 May 2004 by a similar expedition. Another Navy team also successfully scaled Everest from the north face, a technically more challenging route. The expedition was led by Cdr Satyabrata Dam of the submarine arm. Cdr. Dam is a mountaineer of international repute and has climbed many mountains including the Patagonias, the Alps among others. In 2017, to commemorate 50 years of the Navy's first expedition in 1965, a team set off to climb Mount Everest.

An Indian Navy team comprising 11 members successfully completed an expedition to the Arctic pole. To prepare, they first traveled to Iceland, where they attempted to summit a peak. The team next flew to eastern Greenland; in the Kulusuk and Angmassalik areas, they used Inuit boats to navigate the region's ice-choked fjords. They crossed northward across the Arctic Circle, reaching seventy degrees North on skis. The team scaled an unnamed peak of height  and named it Indian Peak.

The Indian Naval ensign first flew in Antarctica in 1981. The Indian Navy succeeded in Mission Dakshin Dhruv 2006 by traversing to the South Pole on skis. With this historic expedition, they have set the record for being the first military team to have successfully completed a ski traverse to the Geographic South Pole. Also, three of the ten member team—the expedition leader—Cdr. Satyabrata Dam, leading medical assistants Rakesh Kumar and Vikas Kumar are now among the few people in the world to have visited the two poles and summited Mt. Everest. Indian Navy became the first organisation to reach the poles and Mt. Everest. Cdr. Dilip Donde completed the first solo circumnavigation by an Indian citizen on 22 May 2010.

Future of the Indian Navy

By the end of the 14th Plan (2020), the Indian Navy was expected to have over 150 ships and close to 500 aircraft. In addition to the existing mission of securing both sea flanks in the Bay of Bengal and the Arabian Sea, the navy was tasked with responding to emergencies far away from the Indian mainland. Marine assault capabilities were to be enhanced by setting up a new amphibious warfare facility at Kakinada, Andhra Pradesh.

Since then, the Indian Navy has initiated Phase II expansion of INS Kadamba, its third largest naval base, near Karwar. Phase II will involve expansion of the berthing facilities to accommodate 40–45 more front-line warships, including the aircraft carrier INS Vikramaditya, raise manpower to 300 officers and around 2,500 sailors, and build a naval air station with a 6,000-foot runway. This is to be followed by Phase IIA and IIB, at the end of which INS Kadamba will be able to base 50 front-line warships. The Indian Navy is also in the process of constructing a new naval base, INS Varsha, at Rambilli for its Arihant class submarines.

India's planned second aircraft carrier, INS Vishal (formerly known as Indigenous Aircraft Carrier-II), will displace around 65,000 tonnes and is expected to be delivered to the Indian Navy in the mid-2030s. With the future delivery of Vishal, the Navy's goal to have three aircraft carriers in service, with two fully operational carriers and a third in refit, will be achieved.

In November 2011, the Defence Acquisition Council launched the Multi-Role Support Vessel. The Indian Navy has subsequently sent out an international RFP for up to 2 large landing helicopter docks. The contenders are expected to tie up with local shipyards for construction of the ships.

In addition to aircraft carriers and large amphibious assault ships, the Indian Navy is acquiring numerous surface combatants such as; the Visakhapatnam-class destroyers,  and  frigates, ASW shallow water corvettes, ASuW corvettes, and MCM vessels.  and plans to build Project 18class destroyers. New submarine classes under various stages of planning and construction include the Project 75 Alpha,  the conventional, Project 75I, and the nuclear-powered. New auxiliary ships include; five replenishment oilers, a Missile Range Instrumentation Ship (MRIS) and an Ocean Surveillance Ship.

The Indian Navy is planning to procure 22 General Atomics Sea Guardian drones at an estimated cost of $2 billion. This is the first instance of General Atomics drones being sold to a non-NATO military.

Accidents

Accidents in the Indian navy have been attributed to ageing ships in need of maintenance, delayed acquisitions by the Ministry of Defence, and human error. However naval commentators also argue that as India's large navy of 160 ships clocks around 12,000 ship-days at sea every year, in varied waters and weather, some incidents are inevitable. Captains of erring ships are dismissed from their command following an enquiry. The accident on board  led to the resignation of the then Chief of Naval Staff (CNS) Admiral D K Joshi on 26 February 2014, who owned moral responsibility. The navy is envisaging a new 'Safety Organisation' to improve safety of its warships, nuclear submarines and aircraft in view of its planned increase in fleet strength over the next decade.

Indian Naval Ensign

The Indian Navy from 1950 to 2001 used a modified version of the British White Ensign, with the Union flag replaced with the Indian Tricolour in the canton. In 2001, this flag was replaced with a white ensign bearing the Indian Navy crest, as the previous ensign was thought to reflect India's colonial past. However complaints arose that the new ensign was indistinguishable as the blue of the naval crest easily merged with the sky and the ocean. Hence in 2004, the ensign was changed back to the St. George's cross design, with the addition of the emblem of India in the intersection of the cross. In 2014, the ensign as well as the naval crest was further modified to include the Devanagari script: सत्यमेव जयते (Satyameva Jayate) which means 'Truth Alone Triumphs' in Sanskrit.

The traditional crest of Indian Navy ships is topped by a crown featuring three sailing ships symbolising India's rich maritime history. The ribbon of the crown depicts the Ashoka Chakra surrounded by a horse and a bull. Each ship has a unique motif which is encircled by a ring of lotus buds.

In August 2022, the Prime Minister's Office announced that the naval ensign featuring the Saint George's Cross would be irrevocably disposed of, in favor of a newer design derived from octagonal shaped Royal seal of Chhatrapati Shivaji Maharaj and his Maratha Navy that would "do away with the colonial past" and reflect the "rich Indian maritime heritage". The new ensign is slated to be revealed by prime minister Narendra Modi on 2 September 2022, coinciding with the commissioning ceremony of INS Vikrant, the Indian Navy's first indigenously-built aircraft carrier. The new ensign retains much the design of the 2001-04 ensign with the national flag as the canton, but with the addition of a octagonal navy blue shield based on Chhatrapati Shivaji Maharaj's royal seal surrounding the heraldic arms in gold and the addition of the official motto of the Navy May the Lord of Waters Be Auspicious Unto Us (Shaṁ No Varunaḥ) in the Devanagari script.

Documents 
 
The Indian Maritime Doctrine is a foundational primer document of the Indian Navy. Three editions have been published in 2004, 2009 and 2014. It has to be considered along with other foundational documents such as the naval strategy Freedom to Use the Seas (2007) and the updated edition Ensuring Secure Seas (2015).

The 2004 edition (INBR 8) was published amidst a larger strategic overhaul in the country. It contains a large number of key words along with their definitions and grouped into a number of sections. Select themes pervade throughout the document. Some themes are subtle such as the ongoing and future transition to a blue-water navy and others are louder such as the text related to nuclear submarines and aircraft carriers. There is justification and explanation for India's need for these transitions and acquisitions. The 2009 edition was updated to include counter-terror, counter-piracy and coordination with other navies in these aspects.

See also

 Indian Ocean Naval Symposium
 Information Management and Analysis Centre (IMAC)
 Naval ranks and insignia of India
 Integrated Defence Staff, tri-services
 Exclusive economic zone of India, protected by IN
 List of ships of the Indian Navy
 Indian Navy Football Team

References

Sources

External links

 Official web site

 
Defence agencies of India
Military units and formations established in 1612